Harmodio Arias Madrid (3 July 1886 – 23 December 1962) was a Panamanian politician. He served as acting President of Panama in January 1931 and again from June 5, 1932, to October 1, 1936, after winning the 1932 presidential election.

Family

His brother Arnulfo Arias was president on three occasions.

Harmodio's son, Roberto was a diplomat and politician who married the great English ballerina Margot Fonteyn.

References

1886 births
1962 deaths
Presidents of Panama
Alumni of the London School of Economics